Cathedral Peak is part of the Cathedral Range, a mountain range in the south-central portion of Yosemite National Park in eastern Mariposa and Tuolumne Counties. The range is an offshoot of the Sierra Nevada. The peak which lends its name to the range derives its name from its cathedral-shaped peak, which was formed by glacial activity: the peak remained uneroded above the glaciers in the Pleistocene.

Geography 

Cathedral Peak has a subsidiary summit to the west called Eichorn Pinnacle, for Jules Eichorn, who first ascended a class 5.4 route to its summit on July 24, 1931, with Glen Dawson.

In 1869, John Muir wrote in My first summer in the Sierra:

Geology 
The Cathedral Peak Granodiorite of Cathedral Peak is an intrusion into an area of older intrusive (or plutonic) and metamorphic rock in the Sierra Nevada Batholith. It is part of a grouping of intrusions called the Tuolumne Intrusive Suite. Cathedral Peak is the youngest of the rock formations in the Suite, dating to the Cretaceous Period at 83 million years ago. Its composition is mainly granodiorite with phenocrysts of microcline.

Cathedral Peak was a nunatak during the Tioga glaciation of the last ice age, the peak projected above the glaciers, which carved and sharpened the peak's base while plucking away at its sides.

See also

 Budd Lake, fairly near Cathedral Peak
 Cathedral Lakes, which are directly below Cathedral Peak
 Cockscomb, another mountain fairly near Cathedral Peak
 Echo Peaks, mountains near Cathedral Peak
 Elizabeth Lake, also fairly near Cathedral Peak
 Matthes Crest, a mountain which is near Cathedral Peak
 Unicorn Peak, a peak which is near Cathedral Peak

References

External links 
 

Geology of Yosemite National Park
Mountains of Yosemite National Park
Mountains of Mariposa County, California
Mountains of Tuolumne County, California
Igneous intrusions
Mountains of Northern California
Cretaceous magmatism
Igneous petrology of California